C-type lectin domain family 2 member B is a protein that in humans is encoded by the CLEC2B gene.

This gene encodes a member of the C-type lectin/C-type lectin-like domain (CTL/CTLD) protein superfamily. Members of this family share a common protein fold and have diverse functions, such as cell adhesion, cell-cell signaling, glycoprotein turnover, and roles in inflammation and immune response. The encoded type 2 transmembrane protein may function as a cell activation antigen. An alternative splice variant has been described but its full-length nucleotide sequence has not been determined. This gene is closely linked to other CTL/CTLD superfamily members on chromosome 12p13 in the natural killer gene complex region.

References

External links

Further reading